The 1969–70 St. Bonaventure Brown Indians men's basketball team represented St. Bonaventure University during the 1969–70 NCAA University Division men's basketball season. The Brown Indians were independent and not a member of a conference. They were led by ninth year head coach Larry Weise as well as 6′ 11″ center Bob Lanier, named a consensus first-team All-American for the second consecutive season. He finished his career with averages of 27.6 points and 15.7 rebounds in 75 career games. St. Bonaventure advanced to the only Final Four in program history. Lanier suffered a knee injury in the Regional final against Villanova and did not play in the Final Four, but would be the top pick in the 1970 NBA Draft and go on to a Hall of Fame career.

Roster

Schedule/results

|-
!colspan=9| NCAA tournament

Rankings

Awards and honors
Bob Lanier – Consensus First-Team All-American

Team players in the 1970 NBA Draft

References

St. Bonaventure
St. Bonaventure Bonnies men's basketball seasons
NCAA Division I men's basketball tournament Final Four seasons
St. Bonaventure